Felimida socorroensis is a species of colourful sea slug, a dorid nudibranch, a marine gastropod mollusc in the family Chromodorididae

Distribution 
The holotype of this species was collected at Cabo Pierce, Isla Socorro, Revillagigedo Islands, Mexico. Additional specimens included in the original description came from Isla Socorro and Isla San Benedicto. It is an eastern Pacific Ocean endemic.

Description

Ecology

References

Chromodorididae
Gastropods described in 2009